Podonectria is a genus in the Podonectriaceae family of fungi.

Species 
9 Species have been identified in Podonectria genus

 Podonectria aurantii (Henn.) Petch 1921
 Podonectria bambusicola (Rehm) Piroz. 1977
 Podonectria coccicola (Ellis & Everh.) Petch 1921
 Podonectria coccorum (Petch) Rossman 1977
 Podonectria echinata Petch 1921
 Podonectria gahnia Dingley 1954
 Podonectria larvispora (Cooke & Massee) Rossman 1977
 Podonectria novae-zelandiae Dingley 1954
 Podonectria tenuispora Dennis 1958

References

External links
Podonectria at Index Fungorum

Tubeufiaceae